State Agencies or Non-Commercial State Agencies in Ireland are public sector bodies of the state that have a statutory obligation to perform specific tasks on behalf of the Government of Ireland. Such agencies are considered "arm's length" bodies as they are largely isolated from the workings of central government. The state agencies are distinct and separate from the civil service. As of Q3, 2016 approximately 12,616 public sector workers are employed in NCSAs.

Department of Agriculture, Food and Marine
 Bord Bia
 Bord Iascaigh Mhara
 Marine Institute Ireland
 National Milk Agency
 Sea Fisheries Protection Authority
 Teagasc

Department of Children, Equality, Disability, Integration and Youth
 The Adoption Authority
 Centre for Young Offenders
 Child and Family Agency
 Irish Human Rights and Equality Commission
 Office of the Ombudsman for Children
 National Disability Authority

Department of Education
 Educational Research Centre
 National Council for Special Education
 PDST Technology in Education
 Caranua, formally Residential Institutions Statutory Fund
 Teaching Council of Ireland

Department of Enterprise, Trade and Employment
 Competition and Consumer Protection Commission
 Enterprise Ireland
 Health and Safety Authority
 IDA Ireland
 InterTradeIreland
 Irish Auditing and Accounting Supervisory Authority
 National Standards Authority of Ireland
 Personal Injuries Assessment Board

Department of the Environment, Climate and Communications
 Commission for Communications Regulation
 Commission for Regulation of Utilities
 Digital Hub Development Authority
 Environmental Protection Agency
 Foyle, Carlingford and Irish Lights Commission
 Inland Fisheries Ireland
 National Oil Reserve Agency
 Sustainable Energy Authority of Ireland

Department of Further and Higher Education, Research, Innovation and Science
 Grangegorman Development Agency
 Higher Education Authority
 Irish Research Council
 Quality and Qualifications Ireland
 Science Foundation Ireland
 SOLAS

Department of Health
 Irish Dental Council
 Food Safety Authority of Ireland
 Food Safety Promotion Board
 Health & Social Care Professionals Council
 Health Information and Quality Authority
 Health Insurance Authority
 Health Products Regulatory Authority
 Health Research Board
 Health Service Executive
 Irish Blood Transfusion Service
 Irish Mental Health Commission
 Medical Council of Ireland
 National Cancer Registry Ireland
 National Paediatric Hospital Development Board
 National Treatment Purchase Fund
 Nursing and Midwifery Board of Ireland
 Pharmaceutical Society of Ireland
 Pre-Hospital Emergency Care Council

Department of Housing, Local Government and Heritage
 An Bord Pleanála
 Dublin Docklands Development Authority
 Electoral Commission
 Heritage Council
 Housing Agency
 Housing Finance Agency
 Irish Water Safety
 Local Government Management Agency
 Residential Tenancies Board
 Tailte Éireann
 Ordnance Survey Ireland
 Waterways Ireland

Department of Justice
 Garda Síochána
 Garda Síochána Ombudsman Commission
 Irish Film Classification Office

Department of Public Expenditure and Reform
 Interreg
 Special EU Programmes Body

Department of Rural and Community Development
 Western Development Commission

Department of Social Protection
 Citizens Information Board
 Pensions Authority

Department of the Taoiseach
 National Economic and Social Council

Department of Tourism, Culture, Arts, Gaeltacht, Sport and Media
 Arts Council
 Coimisiún na Meán
 Chester Beatty Library
 Crawford Art Gallery
 Fáilte Ireland
 Foras na Gaeilge
 Fís Éireann/Screen Ireland
 Irish Museum of Modern Art
 National Concert Hall
 National Library of Ireland
 National Museum of Ireland
 Sport Ireland
 Tourism Ireland
 Údarás na Gaeltachta
 Ulster-Scots Agency

Department of Transport
 Medical Bureau of Road Safety
 Commission for Aviation Regulation
 Commission for Railway Regulation
 Irish Aviation Authority
 Air Accident Investigation Unit
 Irish Rail
 National Transport Authority
 Commission for Railway Regulation
 Railway Accident Investigation Unit
 Road Safety Authority
 Transport Infrastructure Ireland

Office of the Attorney General
 Law Reform Commission

References

External links
Government of Ireland: Agencies

 
Politics of the Republic of Ireland